Arroyo often refers to:
 Arroyo (creek), an intermittently dry creek

Arroyo may also refer to:

People
 Arroyo (surname)

Places

United States
California
 Arroyo Burro Beach, a public beach park in Santa Barbara County, California
 Arroyo de la Laguna, a watercourse in the San Francisco Bay Area, California
 Arroyo Grande, California, a city
 Arroyo Mocho, a watercourse in Alameda County, California
 Arroyo Valle, a stream in the Livermore Valley, California

Pennsylvania
 Arroyo, Pennsylvania

Puerto Rico
 Arroyo, Puerto Rico, a municipality

Texas
 Arroyo Alto, Texas, a neighborhood in the city of La Feria
 Arroyo Gardens, Texas, a census-designated place

West Virginia
Arroyo, West Virginia

Spain
 Arroyomolinos de León, a town and municipality in the province of Huelva

Other
 Restaurante Arroyo in Mexico City, the world's largest Mexican restaurant
 Arroyo, a fictional village in the computer game Fallout 2
 USS Arroyo (SP-197), a United States Navy patrol boat in commission from 1917 to 1918
 The title of a song by band SWA, released as a single and also a track on their third album XCIII

See also
 Aroya (disambiguation)
 Arroyo High School (disambiguation)
 Arroyo Hondo (disambiguation)
 Arroyo Seco (disambiguation)